Taho or TAHO may refer to:
 
 Taho, a Philippine snack food
 Tahoe Resources (stock ticker symbol: TAHO)
 Tasmanian Archive and Heritage Office
 The Animal Health Organization, non-profit animal welfare corporation
 Taho, an abbreviation for Lake Tahoe in disc golf